George Ernest Morrison Henry (13 May 1904 – 3 June 1998) was an Australian freestyle swimmer of the 1920s, who won a silver medal in the 4×200-metre freestyle relay at the 1924 Summer Olympics.  He also competed in the 100-metre freestyle in the same event. He spent the majority of his career in the shadow of his Manly Swimming Club teammate Boy Charlton.

Henry was 18 years of age when he was selected for the 1924 Summer Olympics in Paris.  Competing in the 100-metre freestyle, he reached the semifinals, where he was eliminated.  Henry combined with Australian teammates Frank Beaurepaire, Moss Christie and Charlton to claim the silver medal in the 4×200-metre freestyle relay.  The American relay team, led by Johnny Weissmuller, bested the Australians by almost 7 seconds to set a new world record.

He attended Sydney Boys High School, graduating in 1923.

See also 
 List of Olympic medalists in swimming (men)

References

Bibliography
 

1904 births
1998 deaths
Sportsmen from New South Wales
Swimmers at the 1924 Summer Olympics
Olympic swimmers of Australia
Swimmers from Sydney
Olympic silver medalists for Australia
Australian male freestyle swimmers
Medalists at the 1924 Summer Olympics
Olympic silver medalists in swimming
20th-century Australian people